Euskotren is a public railway operator in the Basque Country, Spain. Its rolling stock is formed by electrical multiple units used for Euskotren Trena commuter rail services, trams running on the Bilbao and Vitoria-Gasteiz tramway networks, and locomotives for hauling freight trains.

Current and future

Electrical multiple units

Locomotives

Trams

Retired 
When Euskotren (known at the time as Basque Railways) was founded in 1982, it inherited the rolling stock FEVE had been using in the Basque Country until then. However, most of FEVE's rolling stock had previously been operated by different private companies, notably Ferrocarriles Vascongados and FTS. Rolling stock acquired during the FEVE years (1972 to 1982) and since the creation of Euskotren (1982 to present) is listed under the section newly built and inherited from FEVE. Rolling stock built for Ferrocarriles Vascongados and FTS before 1972 is listed under different sections.

Newly built and inherited from FEVE

Inherited from Ferrocarriles Vascongados

Inherited from FTS

References 

 
Lists of rolling stock